Kenneth R. Timmerman (born November 4, 1953) is a political writer and conservative activist who was the 2012 Republican nominee for U.S. Representative for the newly redrawn , facing the incumbent Chris Van Hollen, a Democrat. Timmerman lost to Van Hollen, 33% to 63%. In 2000, Timmerman was a candidate for the Republican nomination for U.S. Senator from Maryland. Timmerman is executive director of the Foundation for Democracy in Iran, an organization that works to support democratic movements in Iran. He authored Shakedown: Exposing the Real Jesse Jackson. Timmerman has also written on the spread of weapons of mass destruction in the Middle East. He is currently an Expert at Wikistrat. He ran for Lieutenant Governor of Maryland on a ticket with businessman Charles Lollar in the 2014 Maryland gubernatorial election. The Lollar/Timmerman ticket finished third in the Republican primary.

Early life and career
Born in New York in 1953, Timmerman obtained a BA from Goddard College in 1973 and an M.A. from Brown University in 1976. He moved to France, where he pursued a career as a novelist, publishing a novel called Wren Hunt in 1976 and a novella called The Iskra Scrolls in 1980.

Middle East and defense correspondent
In the early 1980s, Timmerman became a Middle East correspondent for The Atlanta Journal-Constitution and developed an expertise in arms trade. In 1982, he was taken prisoner for 24 days by Fatah guerrillas in Lebanon. He was the first U.S. journalist on the scene when Islamic militants bombed the U.S. Embassy in 1983.

From 1985 to 1987, Timmerman was a correspondent for Defense and Armament Newsweek and Military Technology, covering the Iran–Iraq War and the arms industry in the Middle East. He won the Joe Petrosino Prize for Investigative Reporting in 1987 for an investigation of an Iranian arms procurement group.

From 1987 to 1993, Timmerman published the Middle East Defense News and was international correspondent for Defense Electronics. He also wrote monographs for the Simon Wiesenthal Center on efforts by Iraq, Syria and Libya to acquire weapons of mass destruction.

Author and activist
In 1991, Timmerman published The Death Lobby: How the West Armed Iraq after the Gulf War. Timmerman advised the United Nations Special Commission for the Disarmament of Iraq on the location of weapons plants.

In 1993, Timmerman returned to the US where he worked as a member of the staff of the U.S. House Committee on International Relations. In 1995, he founded the Foundation for Democracy in Iran with Peter Rodman, Joshua Muravchick and Iranian opposition expatriates to attempt to topple the Iranian government. He founded the Middle East Data Project to advise governments and private companies. In 1998, he made suggestions to the Rumsfeld Commission supporting the deployment of a national missile defence system.

In 1998, he wrote a piece on Osama Bin Laden and his training camps in Afghanistan just before Al-Qaeda attacked two US embassies in Africa. He also wrote features for the American Spectator criticizing the export of high-technology equipment to China, which was published as a book in 2000. In 2000 Timmerman sought the nomination of the Maryland GOP to run against Democratic incumbent Paul Sarbanes. Timmerman won less than ten percent in the party primary; Paul Rappaport won the Republican nomination but lost to Sarbanes, who won with 63% of the vote.

Timmerman wrote Shakedown: Exposing the Real Jesse Jackson as a change of pace from his focus on international issues in 2002. The argument claimed that Jackson alleging connections with criminals and claiming that Rev. Jackson practised extortion of businesses. It proved to be highly successful making the top ten bestseller list with 200,000 copies printed. It also reached the top of the Amazon bestseller list.

On February 7, 2006, Sweden's former deputy prime minister and Liberal party leader Per Ahlmark said that he had nominated Timmerman for a Nobel Peace Prize along with UN Ambassador John Bolton for "their repeated warnings and documentation of Iran's secret nuclear buildup and revealing Iran's repeated lying and false reports to the International Atomic Energy Agency." The Nobel Foundation will not confirm nominations, however, until 50 years have passed.

Bibliography

 Honor Killing," Cassiopeia Press, 2007
Dark Forces: The Truth About What Happened in Benghazi, Broadside Books, 2014
Deception: The Making of the YouTube Video Hillary and Obama Blamed for Benghazi, PostHill Press, 2016
ISIS Begins, a Novel of the War in Iraq, PostHill Press, 2019
The Election Heist, PostHill Press, 2020

References

 "Kenneth R. Timmerman" Contemporary Authors Online Gale 2002 published on Biography Resource Center Thomson Gale 2005

External links
 Ken Timmerman's web site
 Insight Magazine Staff Biography for Timmerman
 Open Secrets page on Timmerman's fundraising for his Senate campaign
 Article by Timmerman on "Mullahs Best Friends" published on National Review Online 31 August 2005 (archived)
 Kenneth Timmerman's biography on Wikistrat
 

1953 births
American critics of Islam
American male journalists
American political writers
Timmermann, Kenneth R.
Living people
Maryland Republicans
The American Spectator people